The 2012 IFAF U-19 World Championship took place in 2012 at Austin, Texas. These championship match the world’s eight best high school-aged (19 and under) national American football teams from five continents shall be played at 12,000-capacity Burger Stadium in Austin Texas, a football and soccer venue. The action began on Saturday, June 30 and ran through Saturday, July 8. To win the Gold Medal #2 ranked Canada had to defeat #7 Sweden, #3 Japan and finally #1 USA in the Championship game. The hard road to success turned in a fantastic finish to a great tournament. In doing so, Canada avenged its 50-7 loss in the 2011 IFAF World Championship (which was composed of adult competitors) and handed the U.S. national team its first ever loss in international competition.

Participants & Seeding
1. 
2. 
3. 
4. 
5. 
6. 
7. 
8. 

Three nations from the 2009 U-19 World Championship failed to qualify for this year's event - Mexico, Germany and New Zealand.

Bracket

Winners Bracket

Consolation Bracket

Scores

Game Day 1 - June 30

Game Day 2 - July 3

Game Day 3 - July 4

Game Day 4 - July 6

Game Day 5 - July 7

Official website
http://www.u19championship.com/

See also
IFAF
IFAF World Cup
2009 IFAF Junior World Cup

References

IFAF Junior World Cup
2012 in American football
International sports competitions hosted by the United States